Matachí is one of the 67 municipalities of Chihuahua, in northern Mexico. The municipal seat lies at Matachí. The municipality covers an area of 829.8 km².

As of 2010, the municipality had a total population of 3,104, down from 3,169 as of 2005. 

As of 2010, the town of Matachí had a population of 1,710. Other than the town of Matachí, the municipality had 78 localities, none of which had a population over 1,000.

Geography

Towns and villages
The municipality has 28 localities. The largest are:

References

Municipalities of Chihuahua (state)